, also known as , was an Empress of Japan.

She was Honorary Empress as the adoptive mother or Honorary Mother (准母) of her brother Emperor Juntoku.

Notes

Japanese princesses
Japanese empresses
1195 births
1211 deaths